Da Takeover is a compilation album by Memphis Christian Rap artist Mr. Del. It was released on November 4, 2003 and features appearances by Lady Boo [Also known as Gangsta Boo from Three 6 Mafia], Salt of Salt N Pepa, and Nakia Shine. Like the cover for Church Age, A Parental Advisory-like logo that says Spiritual Advisory Gospel Content can be seen. The album has been long out of print and is very hard to find

Track listing
Holy Ghost Souljah [Performed by Mr. Del]
Da Truth [Performed by Mr. Del]
Genesis To Revelation [Performed by Mr. Del]
Coming Of The King [Performed by Shelle]
Give It All Up [Performed by Tameka Lashaun]
Chills [Performed by DOV]
Step On [Performed by Euclid of Public Announcement]
Christian Girl [Performed by The Remnant]
What's Next [Performed by Ramona Estell-Jones]
N-Line [Performed by Possessed]
Now We Ready [Performed by Mr. Del featuring Lady Boo]
Shine [Performed by Mr. Del featuring Salt of Salt N Pepa]
Da Truth [Remix] [Performed by Mr. Del featuring Nakia Shine]
Outro [Performed by Mr. Del]

References

Hip hop compilation albums
2003 compilation albums
Mr. Del albums